George Michael Small (born November 18, 1956) is an American gridiron football coach and former player.  He served as the head football coach at Kentucky State University from 1995 to 2000 and at North Carolina Agricultural and Technical State University from 2003 to 2005, compiling a career college football record of 49–53.  Small played professionally with the New York Giants of the National Football League (NFL) in 1980 and the Calgary Stampeders of the Canadian Football League (CFL) from 1981 to 1983.

Coaching career
Small was the 25th head football coach at Kentucky State University in Frankfort, Kentucky and he held that position for six seasons, from 1995 until 2000.  His career coaching record at Kentucky State was 33–34.  Small went on to serve as head football coach at his alma mater from 2003 to 2005. He led the Aggies to the NCAA Division I-AA playoffs in 2003.  His record at NC A&T was 16–19.

Head coaching record

College

References

External links
 

1956 births
Living people
American football defensive linemen
Florida A&M Rattlers football coaches
Grambling State Tigers football coaches
Hampton Pirates football coaches
Kentucky State Thorobreds football coaches
Langston Lions football coaches
New York Giants players
North Carolina A&T Aggies football coaches
North Carolina A&T Aggies football players
Savannah State Tigers football coaches
Tulsa Golden Hurricane football coaches
Youngstown State Penguins football coaches
High school football coaches in North Carolina
Coaches of American football from North Carolina
Coaches of American football from Louisiana
Players of American football from North Carolina
Players of American football from Shreveport, Louisiana
African-American coaches of American football
African-American players of American football
20th-century African-American sportspeople
21st-century African-American sportspeople